Tufti Mountain is a summit in Lane County, Oregon, in the United States with an elevation of .

Tufti was named in honor of a Native American (Indian) who lived near the site of Oakridge.

References

Mountains of Lane County, Oregon
Mountains of Oregon